Fire Queen is an early steam locomotive built by A. Horlock and Co in 1848 for the Padarn Railway. It is the only surviving locomotive from that railway, and it is preserved at the Penrhyn Castle Railway Museum.

History
Fire Queen was one of two identical locomotives built for the Padarn Railway, which connected the Dinorwic Quarry near Llanberis in north Wales with the port at Y Felinheli. The railway was opened in 1840 using horses to pull the slate trains. It replaced the even earlier Dinorwic Railway which opened in 1824.

The two locomotives, Fire Queen and Jenny Lind, were built by marine engineers A. Horlock and Co. They were the only railway locomotives built by this company.  The locomotives were based on an 1847 patent of Thomas Crampton, which specified a locomotive with driving wheels positioned at the ends of the boiler driven by steeply inclined cylinders placed between the wheels. The locomotives lacked a frame, and the wheels and cylinders were attached directly to the boiler.

They were delivered to the railway in 1848 and continued working until 1886. Jenny Lind was scrapped, but Fire Queen was placed in a small shed at the quarry workshop, Gilfach Ddu. It stayed there until the quarry closed in 1969 at which time it was sold to John Smith MP and loaned to the nearby Penrhyn Castle Railway Museum where it remains on display.

References

External links
 Fire Queen at the Industrial Railway Society archives (with photographs)

0-4-0 locomotives
Narrow gauge locomotives
Individual locomotives of Great Britain
4 ft gauge railways in Wales